Wittenberg is a surname, and may refer to:

 Arvid Wittenberg (1606–1657), Swedish count and field marshal
 Beata Magdalena Wittenberg (1644–1705), Swedish courtier
 Casey Wittenberg (born 1984), American professional golfer
 Curt Wittenberg, American biologist
 Dave Wittenberg (born 1971), US–based voice actor
 Henry Wittenberg (1918–2010), American wrestler
 Jan Wittenberg (born 1943), Dutch sprint canoeist
 Jeff Wittenberg (born 1973), Australian rugby league player
 John Wittenberg (1939–2005), Australian rugby league player
 Jonathan Wittenberg (born 1957), Scottish rabbi
 Karl Wittenberg, German swimmer
 Marloes Wittenberg (born 1983), Dutch judoka
 Mary Wittenberg (born 1962), American sports executive
 Nicole Wittenberg (born 1979), American artist
 Robert Wittenberg, American politician from Michigan
 Ruth Wittenberg (1899–1990), American historic preservationist
 Yitzhak Wittenberg (1907–1943), Jewish resistance fighter

See also 
 Wittenberg (disambiguation)

Low German surnames